Dasineura gleditchiae, the honeylocust podgall midge, is a species of gall midges, insects in the family Cecidomyiidae. Native to North America it is an invasive species in parts of Europe. Honeylocust podgall midge is a pest of honey locust, forming galls on the foliage.

References

Further reading

External links

 

Cecidomyiinae
Articles created by Qbugbot
Insects described in 1866